The 2022 Players Championship (officially the 2022 Cazoo Players Championship) was a professional ranking snooker tournament that took place from 7 to 13 February 2022 at Aldersley Leisure Village in Wolverhampton, England. It was the tenth ranking event of the 2021–22 season, and the second event of the Cazoo Cup, following the World Grand Prix and preceding the Tour Championship. It featured the top 16 ranked players on the one-year ranking list. The event was broadcast by ITV4 in the United Kingdom, and Eurosport in the rest of Europe.

Zhao Xintong and Hossein Vafaei made their debuts in the event, with Zhao seeded number one after winning the 2021 UK Championship and the 2022 German Masters. Both debutants lost in the first round, with Barry Hawkins defeating Zhao 6–3 and John Higgins beating Vafaei by the same score.

Higgins was the defending champion, having beaten Ronnie O'Sullivan 10–3 in the 2021 final. However, Higgins lost 4–6 to Jimmy Robertson in the quarter-finals. The final was contested between Hawkins, who had previously won the tournament in 2014, and Neil Robertson, who had been runner-up in 2012, 2013, and 2019. Robertson defeated Hawkins 10–5 in a final that featured five century breaks, four by Robertson and a 137 by Hawkins. It was Robertson's first Players Championship title, the 22nd ranking title of his career, and his third tournament win of the season, following the 2021 English Open and the 2022 Masters.

Prize fund 
The breakdown of prize money for the event is shown below:
 Winner: £125,000
 Runner-up: £50,000
 Semi-final: £30,000
 Quarter-final: £15,000
 Last 16: £10,000
 Highest break: £10,000
 Total: £385,000

Seeding list 
The seedings for the tournament were based on the one-year ranking list up to and including the 2022 German Masters.

Tournament draw

Final

Century breaks 
A total of 25 century breaks were made during the tournament.

 141  Kyren Wilson
 139, 135, 132, 123, 103, 100  Yan Bingtao
 137, 126, 115  Barry Hawkins
 134, 108, 101  John Higgins
 130, 116, 114, 107, 105, 100  Neil Robertson
 127  Ronnie O'Sullivan
 123  Ricky Walden
 107, 103, 102  Mark Williams
 102  Jimmy Robertson

References 

Players Championship
Snooker competitions in England
Players Series
Sport in Wolverhampton
February 2022 sports events in the United Kingdom
Players Championship
2022